Antonín Hudeček (14 January 1872, Ředhošť, now part of Mšené-lázně – 11 August 1941, Častolovice) was a Czech landscape painter.

Biography 
After completing his primary education in Roudnice, he studied at the Academy of Fine Arts, Prague, with Maximilian Pirner and Václav Brožík; devoting himself mostly to figure painting. From 1891 to 1893, he continued his studies in Munich with Otto Seitz. He opened a workshop in Prague in 1895.

Shortly after, he joined a group of painters, led by Julius Mařák, that went for plein aire painting excursions; mostly in the area around Okoř. In 1898, he held his first major exhibition at the Mánes Union of Fine Arts, followed by a showing in Vienna in 1900. He made a lengthy trip to Italy and Sicily with Jan Preisler in 1902, returning to Prague by way of Cologne.

After 1909, he worked in the areas near Police nad Metují and paid several visits to Rügen. From 1920, he was a regular visitor to Banská Bystrica in the Tatras. In 1927, he settled in the village of Častolovice, where he lived until his death. He was named a member of the Austrian Academy of Sciences in 1930, and received their award for lifetime achievement. The following year, he and his son, Jiří (1910-1971), an aspiring artist, made an extended stay in Venice.

Selected paintings

References

Further reading 

 Ludmila Karlíková, Antonín Hudeček, Malá Galerie, Odeon 1983
 Olaf Hanel: Krajinou duše Antonína Hudečka / Through Antonín Hudeček's Landscape of the Soul. České Muzeum Výtvarných Umění, 2003,

External links 

ArtNet: More works by Hudeček.
Antonín Hudeček @ AbART

1872 births
1941 deaths
19th-century Czech painters
20th-century Czech painters
Landscape painters
Austrian Academy of Sciences
People from Litoměřice District
Czech male painters
Impressionist painters
19th-century Czech male artists
20th-century Czech male artists